Major General (Retd.) Dr. Mohammad Nasir Uddin is a Bangladesh Awami League politician and the Member of Parliament from Jessore-2. He served as Major General in Bangladesh Army at AMC Corps.

Career
Uddin was elected to parliament from Jessore-2 as a Bangladesh Awami League candidate 30 December 2018.

References

Awami League politicians
Living people
11th Jatiya Sangsad members
1991 births